Ghazazan (also Romanized as Ghazāzān and Ghazzāzān; also known as Kazāzān and Kazzāzān) is a village in Beyarjomand Rural District, Beyarjomand District, Shahrud County, Semnan Province, Iran. At the 2006 census, its population was 368, in 112 families.

References 

Populated places in Shahrud County